Adrian D. Smith (born August 19, 1944) is an American architect. He designed the world's tallest structure, Burj Khalifa, as well as the building projected to surpass it, the Jeddah Tower. Among his other projects, he was the senior architect for the Trump International Hotel & Tower in Chicago, the Jin Mao Tower in Shanghai, and Zifeng Tower in Nanjing.

Early life and education
Adrian Smith was born in Chicago in 1944.  When he was four years old, his family moved to Southern California, where he grew up. His interest in drawing led his mother to suggest that he study architecture.

Smith attended Texas A&M University, pursuing a Bachelor of Architecture while being involved with the Corps of Cadets. However, he did not graduate and instead started working for Skidmore, Owings and Merrill (SOM) in 1967. He finished his education at the University of Illinois, Chicago College of Architecture and Arts, graduating in 1969. In 2013, Smith was presented with an Honorary Doctorate of Letters degree from Texas A&M University.

Career
Smith spent many years at Skidmore, Owings & Merrill (SOM), Chicago, beginning in 1967 and was a Design Partner from 1980 to 2003 and a Consulting Design Partner from 2003 to 2006. In 2006, he founded Adrian Smith + Gordon Gill Architecture (AS+GG), which is dedicated to the design of high-performance, energy-efficient and sustainable architecture on an international scale. In 2008, he co-founded the MEP firm of PositivEnergy Practice (PEP), which specializes in the environmental engineering of high-performance, energy-efficient architecture.

Recognition
Projects Smith designed have won over 125 awards including 5 international awards, 9 National American Institute of Architects Awards, 35 State and Chicago AIA Awards, and 3 Urban Land Institute Awards for Excellence. He was the recipient of the CTBUH 2011 Lynn S. Beedle Lifetime Achievement Award. Smith's work at SOM has been featured in museums in the United States, South America, Europe, Asia and the Middle East. He is a Senior Fellow of the Design Futures Council.

Selected projects
The following is an abridged list of work Smith was primarily responsible for as a partner at Skidmore, Owings & Merrill: or as Design Partner at Adrian Smith + Gordon Gill Architecture.

Completed

Currently under construction

Significant unbuilt projects

Monographs
 Smith, Adrian, The Architecture of Adrian Smith, SOM: Toward a Sustainable Future, Images Publishing Group Pty Ltd, 
 Smith, Adrian, Pro Architect 24: Adrian D Smith, Archiworld Company Ltd,

References

External links

Adrian Smith + Gordon Gill Architecture - official website
Bloomberg Businessweek 'Shedding the Vortex' March 24, 2014
Popular Science 'The Rise of the Supertall' February 15, 2013
Modern Luxury 'On Top of the World' March 15, 2012
The Wall Street Journal 'The State of Super-Tall Towers' July 8, 2011
The Architect's Newspaper 'Smart Grid City' January 17, 2011
Chicago Tribune Article 'Sweet new start for architect Adrian Smith' Feb 24, 2008

Modernist architects
Postmodern architects
20th-century American architects
21st-century American architects
1944 births
Living people
Architects from Chicago
Artists from Evanston, Illinois
Texas A&M University alumni
University of Illinois Chicago alumni
Skyscraper architects
Skidmore, Owings & Merrill people